Gregory Paul Austin (born 2 August 1992) is an English actor, best known for his roles as Travis Leich in Amazon Prime's Hunters and Charlie Smith in the BBC's Doctor Who spin-off Class.

Early life
Austin grew up in Bournemouth, England, and has three sisters. Before becoming an actor, he started off as a dancer, studying modern, ballet, tap and street dance, which got him into musical theatre. After this, he studied at Arts Educational in London, where he finished his musical theatre degree in 2013.

Career
From 2014 to 2016 Austin starred as the young Gordon Selfridge in ITV's Mr Selfridge, a job he got even before finishing his theatre degree. He also appeared as Rufus Barton in one episode of Law & Order: UK.

In 2015 Austin appeared in the short film Into the Surf.

In 2016 Austin was cast in the BBC Three Doctor Who spin-off Class as Charlie Smith, an alien who falls in love with his classmate Matteusz. At first Austin didn't know his character was alien: when he read the script he presumed that Charlie was a bit socially inept and might have mild Asperger's syndrome, an interpretation that helped him to have a different way of looking at things and to get an alien perspective.

In 2017, he starred in a popular Wrigley's chewing gum commercial and appeared in series 5 of ITV's Endeavour as Rufus Barton.

In 2018 and 2020 Austin reprised his role as Charlie in several audio plays by Big Finish. He then appeared briefly as a "synth" in the Channel 4 series Humans.

In 2019, he had a guest lead role on Stephen Poliakoff's Summer of Rockets, which premiered on BBC2 on 22 May 2019.

In 2020, he played a lead role in Hunters, airing on Amazon Prime, as "Travis Leich", a fanatical young Nazi enforcer. For the second season he had a full frontal nude scene, the first in his career.

Filmography

TV series

Film

Audio

References

External links

Living people
1992 births
21st-century English male actors
English male film actors
English male television actors
Male actors from Dorset
People from Bournemouth